National Highway 53 (NH 53) was a National Highway in Northeast India that connected  Badarpur, Assam with Imphal, Manipur.

Route
Silchar, Kashipur, Pailapool, Fulertal, Jiribam, Nungba, Saengrung, Taobam,  Noney, Tupul, Keithelmanbi, Khumbong, Imphal.

See also
 List of National Highways in India (by Highway Number)
 National Highways Development Project

References

External links
  Old NH 53 on OpenStreetMap
  Route map of NH 53

53
53
National highways in India (old numbering)